A. horridus may refer to:

 Abdopus horridus, an octopus species in the genus Abdopus
 Acanthopholis horridus, an ankylosaurid dinosaur species that lived during the Early Cretaceous Period around 100 million years ago
 Acanthosicyos horridus, an unusual melon species found only in Namibia
 Argosarchus horridus, the New Zealand giant stick insect, a stick insect species endemic to New Zealand

See also
 Horridus (disambiguation)